Zavolzhsky is a rural locality (a settlement) and the administrative center of Zavolzhskoye Rural Settlement, Pallasovsky District, Volgograd Oblast, Russia. The population was 1,828 as of 2010. There are 17 streets.

Geography 
Zavolzhsky is located 2 km north of Pallasovka (the district's administrative centre) by road. Pallasovka is the nearest rural locality.

References 

Rural localities in Pallasovsky District